Lee Vining (formerly Leevining, Poverty Flat, and Lakeview) is an unincorporated community and census-designated place (CDP) in Mono County, California, United States. Lee Vining is located on the southwest shore of Mono Lake. The population was 217 as of the 2020 census.

History
The town was named after Leroy Vining, who founded the town in 1852 as a mining camp. In 1926, the town was laid out by Chris Mattly and named "Lakeview", but when a post office was sought in 1928, it was learned that another town, Lakeview, California, already had the name. The name of Lee Vining was chosen in 1953. The place was also called "Poverty Flat" for its unfavorable conditions for agriculture.

Geography
Lee Vining is in western Mono County along U.S. Route 395, at the eastern base of the Sierra Nevada. US 395 leads northwest  to Bridgeport, the Mono county seat, and southeast the same distance to the junction for Mammoth Lakes. California State Route 120 climbs west from Lee Vining  to the top of Tioga Pass, the east entrance to Yosemite National Park.

Climate
Lee Vining, on the boundary between the Sierra Nevada and Great Basin ecoregions, has a transitional climate: warmer and drier than the mountains to the west but cooler and much snowier than the vast desert to the east. Precipitation is highest in the winter months of December through March, but some can be expected to fall every month of the year, and the town does not typically experience the four to six month dry spells of more coastal parts of California.

Economy
The economy of Lee Vining relies largely on tourism, since it is the closest town to the east entrance of Yosemite National Park, and is near other tourist destinations such as Mono Lake, the ghost town of Bodie, popular trout fishing destinations, and June Mountain and Mammoth Mountain ski areas and the June Lake recreational area. Although off-season tourism has increased in recent years, most tourists visit in the summer months because State Route 120 through Yosemite is often closed otherwise because of heavy snowfall in the winter. Lee Vining has a year-round information center for visitors.

Sights
The town is the site of the Upside-Down House, a distinctive local landmark built by silent film actress Nellie Bly O'Bryan. Also located in the town is the Whoa Nellie Deli, which was once described by the San Francisco Chronicle as "a misplaced Fellini set carved into the edge of the Mono Basin, dust devils skipping around in the distance like extras on the floor of Owens Valley."

The town is home to the Mono Cone burger and ice-cream store, open in the spring and summer. Gus Hess Park commemorates an early miner in Lee Vining.

Lee Vining is situated near the foot of Lee Vining Canyon. State Route 120 runs from town, through the canyon, up to Tioga Pass. Lee Vining Canyon is one of only two ice climbing venues in California.  U.S. Route 395 also runs through the town, connecting to Los Angeles  to the south, and Reno, Nevada  to the north.

The Lee Vining Airport lies near the town. The ZIP Code is 93541. The community is inside area codes 442 and 760.

Demographics
The 2010 United States Census reported that Lee Vining had a population of 222. The racial makeup of Lee Vining was 126 (56.8%) White, 0 (0.0%) African American, 25 (11.3%) Native American, 0 (0.0%) Asian/Pacific Islander, 64 (28.8%) from other races, and 7 (3.2%) from two or more races. Hispanic or Latino of any race were 96 persons (43.2%).

The Census reported that 213 people (95.9% of the population) lived in households, 9 (4.1%) lived in non-institutionalized group quarters, and 0 (0%) were institutionalized.

There were 85 households, out of which 31 (36.5%) had children under the age of 18 living in them, 44 (51.8%) were opposite-sex married couples living together, 4 (4.7%) had a female householder with no husband present, 5 (5.9%) had a male householder with no wife present.  There were 5 (5.9%) unmarried opposite-sex partnerships, and 1 (1.2%) same-sex married couples or partnerships. 28 households (32.9%) were made up of individuals, and 6 (7.1%) had someone living alone who was 65 years of age or older. The average household size was 2.51.  There were 53 families (62.4% of all households); the average family size was 3.25.

The population was spread out, with 56 people (25.2%) under the age of 18, 26 people (11.7%) aged 18 to 24, 71 people (32.0%) aged 25 to 44, 52 people (23.4%) aged 45 to 64, and 17 people (7.7%) who were 65 years of age or older.  The median age was 30.4 years. For every 100 females, there were 107.5 males.  For every 100 females age 18 and over, there were 102.4 males.

There were 112 housing units at an average density of 21.5 per square mile (8.3/km2), of which 43 (50.6%) were owner-occupied, and 42 (49.4%) were occupied by renters. The homeowner vacancy rate was 2.3%; the rental vacancy rate was 10.6%.  108 people (48.6% of the population) lived in owner-occupied housing units and 105 people (47.3%) lived in rental housing units.

Government

Education
Lee Vining is in the Eastern Sierra Unified School District. An elementary school and a high school (Lee Vining High School) are located in Lee Vining. Lee Vining also has a public library.

References

External links 
 
 Lee Vining Chamber of Commerce
 Mono Lake website

Census-designated places in Mono County, California
Populated places in the Sierra Nevada (United States)
Populated places established in 1852
1852 establishments in California